Maciej Miechowita (also known as Maciej z Miechowa, Maciej of Miechów, Maciej Karpiga, Matthias de Miechow; 1457 – 8 September 1523) was a Polish renaissance scholar, professor of Jagiellonian University, historian, chronicler, geographer, medical doctor (royal physician of king Sigismund I the Old of Poland), alchemist, astrologer and canon in Kraków.

Life
He studied at the Jagiellonian University (also known that as the Cracow Academy), obtaining his master's degree in 1479. Between 1480-1485 he studied abroad. Upon his return to the country, he became a professor at the Jagiellonian University, where he served as a rector eight times (1501–1519), and also twice as a deputy chancellor of the Academia.

His  (Treatise on the Two Sarmatias) is considered the first accurate geographical and ethnographical description of Eastern Europe. It provided the first systematic description of the lands between the Vistula, the Don and the Caspian Sea. This work also repeated after Jan Długosz and popularised abroad the myth of Sarmatism: that Polish nobility (szlachta) are descendants from the ancient Sarmatians.

He has also written other works, many of which appeared only in manuscripts and were not printed during his lifetime, like his biography of Saint John Cantius.

Selected works

, print. 1508;
, print. 1508;
, print. 1512;
, print. 1517;
, print. 1919, 1921.

See also
List of Roman Catholic scientist-clerics

References

Further reading
Marek Stachowski: Miechowita's knowledge of East European languages (mainly Hungarian, Lithuanian and Tatar), based on his Tractatus de duabus Sarmatiis (1517). – [in:] Studia Linguistica Universitatis Iagellonicae Cracoviensis 130 (2013): 309-316.

External links
 Works by Maciej Miechowita in digital library Polona

1457 births
1523 deaths
Jagiellonian University alumni
People from Miechów County
15th-century alchemists
16th-century alchemists
16th-century Latin-language writers
Academic staff of Jagiellonian University
Polish alchemists
Polish astrologers
Polish geographers
15th-century Polish historians
Polish male non-fiction writers
Canons of Kraków
Polish male writers
Catholic clergy scientists
Rectors of the Jagiellonian University
16th-century Polish writers
16th-century male writers
16th-century Polish physicians
16th-century astrologers
16th-century Polish historians